The Dhundhubhi River is a part of the Krishna River located in Telangana. Dhundhubhi river pass through  Raghupathi pet village, kalwakurhty, NagarKurnool Dist in  Telangana, India.

Rama Giri temple is located near the river.

Rivers of Telangana
Rivers of India